Angus Wilton McLean (April 20, 1870June 21, 1935) was an American lawyer and banker who was the 56th governor of North Carolina, serving from 1925 to 1929.  McLean also served as Assistant Secretary of the United States Department of the Treasury from 1920 to 1921.

Biography
He was born in Maxton, North Carolina and educated at the University of North Carolina at Chapel Hill, where he earned a law degree in 1892. McLean first entered politics in 1892, serving as the chairman of the Robeson County Democratic Executive Committee. A supporter of Woodrow Wilson, he was a delegate to Democratic National Conventions and sat on the Democratic National Committee. From 1918 to 1922 he served on the War Finance Corporation board, and from 1920 to 1921 he was the assistant secretary of the Treasury.

McLean secured the Democratic gubernatorial nomination in 1924 by defeating Josiah W. Bailey. During his tenure, an executive budget system was initiated; a department of conservation and development was established; and the Great Smoky Mountains National Park was formed. Governor McLean also helped streamlined North Carolina's economy, which led to a $2.5 million state budget surplus that his successor Oliver Gardner claimed later helped the state survive the Great Depression. After completing his term, McLean retired from political life.

He died on June 21, 1935, in Washington, D.C. Death was attributed to a blood clot in his right lung. He had been ill for several weeks.

Legacy
His son, Hector (1920–2012), became a bank president and state senator.

The McLean family of Robeson county, origins are well documented and integrated in the larger narrative of the region. Through marriage and direct relations Angus Wilton McLean is related to the following individuals:

 Malcom McLean, Trucking Tycoon and "Father of the Intermodal Shipping container"
 Flora MacDonald, "Scottish Heroine"
"Devil John" Bethea, "South Carolina Revolutionary War Hero"
 Virgil Goode, Member of US House of Representatives from Virginia's 5th District

References

1870 births
1935 deaths
Democratic Party governors of North Carolina
United States Assistant Secretaries of the Treasury
People from Robeson County, North Carolina
Woodrow Wilson administration personnel
University of North Carolina School of Law alumni